"Caroline" is a song by British singer Arlo Parks. It was the fifth single to be released from her debut album Collapsed in Sunbeams (2021).

Background
Caroline debuted to streaming platforms on 23 November 2020, the same day it premiered as Annie Mac's Hottest Record in the World on BBC Radio 1. Describing the song, Parks said "’Caroline’ is an exercise in people watching and seeing situations unfold without context, It’s an exploration of how something once full of healthy passion can dissolve in an instant." The song describes a fallout between a couple from the perspective of an onlooker waiting for the bus.

Music video
The music video was released in December 2020.

Critical reception
Molly Rushton from Redbrick described Caroline as "melancholy" and stated that it "captures a tragic energy". Rushton called it "one of the best singles to have come from Parks yet". Robin Murray from Clash also praised the song.

Charts

References

2020 songs
2020 singles
Arlo Parks songs